DCN may refer to:

Daily Cargo News, an Australian monthly shipping magazine
Decorin, a protein encoded by the DCN gene
Deputy Chief of Navy, Australia
Direction des Constructions Navales, French shipbuilder
Dorsal cochlear nucleus, a structure on the brainstem
Dynamic circuit network, a computer network technology
RAAF Base Curtin, IATA airport code "DCN"